You Can't Get Away with It is a 1923 American silent romantic drama film directed by Rowland V. Lee and starring Percy Marmont, Malcolm McGregor, and Betty Bouton.

Plot
As described in a film magazine review, Jill, Jane, and May Mackie are left penniless when their father dies. They obtain employment but department store work breaks down Jill's health. Charles Hemingway, cursed with a selfish, unsympathetic wife, grows fond of Jill and she goes to live with him. Later, he dies and she has an opportunity to marry Henry Adams. Facing exposure, she confesses her past. He discards her and she returns to work as a store clerk, convinced that there is no escape from the penalties of doing wrong.

Cast

Preservation
With no prints of You Can't Get Away with It located in any film archives, it is a lost film.

References

Bibliography
 Solomon, Aubrey. The Fox Film Corporation, 1915-1935: A History and Filmography. McFarland, 2011.

External links

1923 films
1923 drama films
American drama films
Films directed by Rowland V. Lee
Films set in department stores
American silent feature films
American black-and-white films
Fox Film films
1923 lost films
Lost American films
Lost drama films
1920s English-language films
1920s American films
Silent American drama films